Westfälische Rinderwurst is a type of German sausage known as a Grützwurst and is made from beef, beef dripping, vegetables, pearl barley or groats and butter. This Westphalian speciality is served hot, heated in water or roasted, and eaten with bread, boiled potatoes and the like.

The Calenberger Pfannenschlag or Knipp is a very similar dish from the Calenberg Land near Hanover, which can however be made from pork.

See also
 Frankfurter Rindswurst
 Stippgrütze

German sausages
Westphalian cuisine